Fixed at Zero is the first and only studio album by American experimental rock band VersaEmerge, released through Fueled by Ramen on June 22, 2010.

The album was made available for pre-order on iTunes and the Fueled by Ramen store on May 11, 2010.

The first single off the album, "Fixed at Zero", was released on July 13, 2010. The second single, "Your Own LoV.E.", was released on January 12, 2011. The third single, "Figure It Out", was released on April 6, 2011.

Reception

Fixed at Zero received positive reviews. Alternative Press gave the album 4 out of 5 stars, applauding the album on its broad dynamic range. AbsolutePunk praised the band's work on the album, stating "In a time where a lot of similar acts care more about style rather than substance, VersaEmerge is a breath of fresh air." Sputnik Music gave the album 3.5 out of 5 stars, stating "If you haven’t given Versa a shot, either because pop-rock’s not your thing, or you feel obligated to hate everything Fueled by Ramen touches, consider this a dare. The band is a breath of ingenuity in a pretty stale parade of warped tour schlock." The Sound Alarm gave the album a score of 8 out of 10, stating "These guys have a very bright future in the music industry, and it couldn’t be more relevant in this release, Fixed at Zero."

Track listing

Personnel
Fixed at Zero album personnel as listed on Allmusic.

VersaEmerge
 Sierra Kusterbeck – lead vocals
 Blake Harnage – lead guitar, backing vocals, programming
 Devin Ingelido  – bass, backing vocals

Additional musicians
 Dorian Crozier - drums, percussion

Artwork and design
 Eika Dopludo - Illustrations
 Rachelle Dupéré - Art direction

Production
 Dave Bassett - Producer, engineer
 Bret Disend - Executive producer
 Erik Ron - Engineer
 J.R. McNeely - Mixing
 Stephen Marcussen - Mastering
 Michelle Piza - Package manager
 Guy Sigsworth - Programming
 Matt Feldman - Management
 Mark Weiss - Management

References

2010 debut albums
Fueled by Ramen albums
Versa (band) albums